Cristina Manolache is a mathematician and Senior Lecturer in the School of Mathematics and Statistics at the University of Sheffield.

Education and career

Manolache received her PhD in Mathematics from SISSA in 2009. Her dissertation, Virtual Intersections, was supervised by Barbara Fantechi. Manolache specializes in algebraic geometry and has expertise in birational geometry and wall crossings. She has contributed to publications of the American Mathematical Society and Cambridge University Press. Notable publications include Reduced invariants from cuspidal maps (2020), co-authored with Luca Battistella and Francesca Carocci; Stable maps and stable quotients (2014); Virtual pull-backs] (2012); and Virtual push-forwards (2012).

Awards and honors

Manolache was awarded the Emmy Noether Fellowship in 2020.

References 

Living people
Year of birth missing (living people)
21st-century Italian mathematicians
Italian women mathematicians
21st-century Italian women